The 1985 European Figure Skating Championships was a senior-level international competition held at the Scandinavium in Gothenburg, Sweden from February 4 to 10. Elite skaters from European ISU member nations competed in the disciplines of men's singles, ladies' singles, pair skating, and ice dancing.

Results

Men

Ladies

Pairs

Ice dancing

References

External links
 results

European Figure Skating Championships, 1985
European Figure Skating Championships, 1985
European Figure Skating Championships
International figure skating competitions hosted by Sweden
International sports competitions in Gothenburg
1980s in Gothenburg
February 1985 sports events in Europe